John Simon Cockle (29 September 1908 – 3 August 1966) was an Australian politician. Born in Harrington, Cumbria, England, he migrated as a child to Australia, where he attended Sydney Church of England Grammar School. He was secretary of the Australian Steamship Owners' Federation before serving in the military 1941–46 during World War II. He was an alderman on Sydney City Council from 1953 to 1956. In 1961, he was elected to the Australian House of Representatives as the Liberal member for Warringah. He held the seat until his death in 1966 (no by-election was held due to the upcoming federal election).

References

Liberal Party of Australia members of the Parliament of Australia
Members of the Australian House of Representatives for Warringah
Members of the Australian House of Representatives
1908 births
1966 deaths
British emigrants to Australia
Place of death missing
20th-century Australian politicians
People from Harrington, Cumbria